The Juma Mosque of Derbent is the oldest mosque in Russia and the CIS. The mosque is located in the center of the old part of Derbent, a city in the Russian Republic of Dagestan. Despite its centuries-old history, the mosque is well preserved. It is an object of cultural heritage of the peoples of the Russian Federation of federal significance. The Juma Mosque is included in the UNESCO cultural heritage register.

History
In 733, one mosque was built in each of the 7 mahallahs of Derbent. Together with these mosques, a large mosque was built for the common Friday prayer. The number of mosques changed over time, and already in 1796 there were 15 mosques in Derbent. Above the entrance to the mosque there is an inscription stating that in 1368-1369 the mosque was restored after the earthquake by Tazhuddin from Baku. In 1815, the expansion and formation of the entire complex of the mosque was completed. In the 1930s, the mosque was closed during the atheist campaign that was launched throughout the USSR.

In 1474-1475 began the construction of a madrasa. However, its expansion and the formation of the entire complex was completed only in 1815.

From 1938 to 1943 it was rebuilt into a city prison. In 1943, by a decree from Moscow, the mosque was returned to the clergy of the city with the right to further use it for its intended purpose. In the Soviet Union years, the Juma mosque was the largest in the North Caucasus, and until recent years it remained the only one in all of South Dagestan. For this reason, believers from different regions of South Dagestan came to Derbent for Friday prayers.

In the 1940s, the charter of the mosque was developed and the adherents elected a board of 20 people. The Sunni and Shiite communities of the city have their own imams.

In 2015, in preparation for the celebration of the 2000th anniversary of Derbent, restoration work was carried out at the mosque.

Architecture
Today, the complex of the Juma Mosque consists of the main mosque, madrasa and living quarters for the clergy. At the time of construction of the mosque (733-734) it was the largest building in the city. The dimensions of the mosque are: 68 meters - from west to east, and 28 meters - from south to north. The height of the dome is 17 meters.

The interior of the mosque consists of three naves, separated by square pillars with profiled capitals. The middle nave is 6.3 meters wide, and the side naves are 4 meters wide. Lancet arches are thrown between the pillars.

The courtyard of the mosque has dimensions of 55 by 45 meters. The courtyard of the mosque is decorated with four old plane trees, by which the Juma Mosque can be recognized from anywhere in Derbent. In 2012, the plane trees of the Juma Mosque were recognized as natural monuments of all-Russian significance and taken under the protection of the Council for the Preservation of the Natural Heritage of the Nation in the Federation Council of the Federal Assembly of the Russian Federation.

Photo Gallery

Notes

Cultural heritage monuments in Derbent
History of Derbent
Buildings and structures completed in 734
World Heritage Sites in Russia
Cultural heritage monuments of federal significance in Dagestan
Religious buildings and structures in Dagestan
Mosques in Russia